Chad Hayes may refer to:

Chad Hayes (American football) (born 1979), American football player
Chad Hayes (writer) (born 1961), American writer